Peep Aru (born on 20 April 1953 in Abja-Paluoja) is an Estonian politician. He has been member of X, XI and XII Riigikogu and is the former Minister of Regional Affairs of Estonia. Aru has been the Deputy Mayor of Viljandi from 1993 until 1996, the Deputy Governor of Viljandi from 1989 until 1993 and the Mayor of Viljandi 1999 from 2003 and again, from  2005 until 2007.

He is a member of Estonian Reform Party.

References

1953 births
Living people
Estonian Reform Party politicians
Members of the Riigikogu, 2003–2007
Members of the Riigikogu, 2007–2011
Members of the Riigikogu, 2011–2015
Members of the Riigikogu, 2015–2019
Mayors of places in Estonia
Estonian University of Life Sciences alumni
People from Abja-Paluoja